The  New York Giants season was the franchise's 8th season in the National Football League.

Schedule

Standings

See also
List of New York Giants seasons

New York Giants seasons
New York Giants
New York
1930s in Manhattan
Washington Heights, Manhattan